Moulvi Abdul Munim Choudhury was an Indian Bengali politician and Islamic scholar. He was the former two-time member of the Assam Legislative Assembly for the Karimganj South constituency.

Early life and family
Choudhury was born into a scholarly Bengali Muslim family of Choudhuries in the village of Bagbari in Karimganj (then under Sylhet district). His ancestors had either migrated from Ghor Province in Afghanistan during the Mughal period, or were descended from Shah Umar Yemeni, one of the 360 companions of the Sufi saint Shah Jalal. Choudhury's great-grandfather, Najib Ali Choudhury, was an Islamic scholar who had founded Madinatul Uloom Bagbari, the first modern madrasa in the Sylhet region, and his grandfather Ghulam Rab Choudhury was also an Islamic scholar. Choudhury was educated in the Islamic tradition and received the title of Moulvi.

According to a handwritten manuscript by his grandfather's elder brother Abdul Hai Choudhury, the family was descended from Gawhar Khan, a nobleman from Badakhshan. Khan was said to have given up his wealth to his younger brother, and become a da'i in Hindustan, taking with him a handwritten ancestral mus'haf by Mir Husayn (dating to 1056 AH / 1647 CE), gilded by Muhammad Yusuf Ali. The emperor granted him jagirs near the village of Kaliganj, near present-day Karimganj district.

Career
In 1948, Choudhury was appointed the first Shaykhul Hadith (Professor of Hadith) at the Madinatul Uloom Bagbari madrasa.

He was associated with the Indian National Congress party. He won a seat in the Karimganj South constituency after participating in the 1962 Assam Legislative Assembly election.

References

Indian National Congress politicians from Assam
Assam MLAs 1962–1967
Year of birth missing
People from Karimganj district
20th-century Bengalis
20th-century Indian Muslims
Bengali Muslim scholars of Islam
Indian Sunni Muslim scholars of Islam
Assam MLAs 1957–1962